The UK Afrobeats Singles Chart is a record chart compiled in the United Kingdom by the Official Charts Company (OCC) to determine the 20 most popular singles in the afrobeats genre. The chart is compiled by the OCC from digital downloads, physical record sales and audio streams in UK retail outlets. The chart was launched for the first time in 2020, with the first chart being revealed on BBC Radio 1Xtra on 26 July 2020, and was published on the official OCC website and BBC Radio 1Xtra's website.

The introduction of the chart came about due to the rising popularity of afrobeats music and artists in the United Kingdom.

, the act with most number one appearances in the chart is NSG with seven appearances, "Grandad" and "Lupita", which led the chart on the first two weeks of its creations, followed by "Drunk Guitar", "Petite", "Don't Play Me" (with Shaybo), "Only God Can Judge Me" (featuring Mist) and "Headliner".

Number ones

2020

2021

2022

2023

See also
 UK Afrobeats Chart Top 20 songs of 2020

References

External links
 Official Afrobeats Singles Chart Top 20 at the Official Charts Company

British record charts
BBC Radio 1
2020 establishments in the United Kingdom